Thomas Raymond Mastny (born February 4, 1981) is a former Major League Baseball right-handed relief pitcher. He stands  in height and weighs . Mastny is the only Indonesian-born player in Major League history. He was raised in Zionsville, Indiana, where he played for Zionsville Community High School. He made his major league debut with the Indians on July 25, .

Career
Mastny, nicknamed "Mr. Nasty", was born in Bontang, Indonesia, and played collegiate baseball at Furman University, where he was primarily used as a starting pitcher. In , he was named the Southern Conference Pitcher of the Year, but was not widely regarded as a top-tier prospect. He was selected in the 11th round of the 2003 draft by the Toronto Blue Jays, and began his professional career with the Auburn Doubledays of the Single-A New York–Penn League.

In , he played a full season with the Single-A Charleston Alley Cats, before being sent to the Cleveland Indians in the offseason to complete an earlier trade in which Toronto acquired infielder John McDonald.

After beginning the  season in the starting rotation of the Single-A Kinston Indians, Mastny was converted into a relief role. Later that year, he was promoted to the Double-A Akron Aeros, with whom he remained to begin the  season, before being called up for a stint in the bullpen of the Triple-A Buffalo Bisons.

Although still mostly unheralded as a prospect, due partly to his age (then 25), Mastny's career quickly accelerated that summer as the unexpectedly non-contending Indians began shuffling a bullpen that often struggled, particularly after the trade of closer Bob Wickman. The rookie pitcher—whose role with Akron and Buffalo was almost exclusively in middle relief, and who had recorded only three saves in the minors—was given an opportunity to close essentially by default, earning his first save with two scoreless innings against the Tampa Bay Devil Rays on August 19. That day, manager Eric Wedge announced that Mastny would be among those tried out in the role over the remainder of the season.

Mastny catapulted onto the national scene after earning a victory in Game 2 of the 2007 American League Championship Series. He was brought in to face the heart of the Red Sox lineup in the bottom of the tenth inning, in which he retired David Ortiz, Manny Ramírez, and Mike Lowell in order. The Indians would go on to score seven times in the top of the 11th, handing the victory to Mastny.

He was recalled on April 15, 2008, when Joe Borowski went on the 15-day disabled list. Mastny made his first career start on June 3, 2008, against the Texas Rangers.

On December 7, 2008, the Indians sold Mastny's contract to the Yokohama BayStars of the Japanese Central League. Mastny had a 1-5 record, with an ERA of 5.69 in 15 games, for the BayStars in 2009.

Birthplace confusion
Mastny's birthplace was briefly the source of some confusion after the Philadelphia Daily News's Paul Hagen reported on August 11, 2006, "it was discovered that the [Cleveland Indians] media guide lists Indiana-born reliever Tom Mastny as being from Indonesia". Hagen's quote was part of a brief that was syndicated on several Internet news sites and subsequently was repeated by other writers and bloggers. That same weekend, it was reported that members of the Society for American Baseball Research had contacted Mastny's father to confirm that, although the family hails from Indiana, the pitcher was indeed born on the Indonesian island of Borneo.

That the relatively unknown Mastny's biographical trivia would be subject to scrutiny is in part due to historical implications, as he is the first Indonesian-born player to reach the major leagues, as reported by ESPN columnist Keith Law:

Cleveland farmhand Tom Mastny was born in Indonesia, although it was to American parents who wanted to travel the world. The 6-5 [sic] Mastny has a fringe-average fastball but outstanding control, and with a good season so far between Double-A Akron and Triple-A Buffalo, he seems likely to become the first big leaguer born in Indonesia, which would become the 52nd country to produce a major league player.

References

External links
, or MLB.com player info page

1981 births
Living people
Akron Aeros players
American expatriate baseball players in Japan
Auburn Doubledays players
Baseball players from Indiana
Buffalo Bisons (minor league) players
Charleston AlleyCats players
Cleveland Indians players
Furman Paladins baseball players
Furman University alumni
Kinston Indians players
Leones del Caracas players
Major League Baseball pitchers
Major League Baseball players from Indonesia
New Orleans Zephyrs players
Nippon Professional Baseball pitchers
People from Bontang
People from Zionsville, Indiana
Somerset Patriots players
Sportspeople from East Kalimantan
Yokohama BayStars players
American expatriate baseball players in Venezuela